Events in the year 1862 

in India:

Incumbents
Charles Canning, Viceroy

Events
Girls' High School & College, Allahabad, is founded.
 The Delhi Department of Police is founded.

Law
 Indian Councils Act 1861 
 Indian Civil Services Act
 Indian High Courts Act
Police Act
Stage-Carriages Act
Foreign Law Ascertainment Act (British statute)
East India Loan Act (British statute)
Malicious Damages Act (British statute)
Wills Act (British statute)
Domicile Act (British statute)

Births
27 January: Baba Tajuddin Nagpuri, Sufi, saint, healer (died 1925).
7 May: Rabindranath Tagore, poet, artist, playwright, novelist and composer (died 1941).
24 September: Bhikaiji Cama, independence campaigner (died 1936).
Date unknown: Devaki Nandan Khatri, first author of mystery novels in Hindi (died 1913).
18 July:Kadambini Ganguly, first female medical practitioner and one of the first female graduates of the then Indian subcontinent (died 1923).

 
India
Years of the 19th century in India